Civic Voice is the national charity for the civic movement in England. It was set up in 2010 following the demise of the Civic Trust. It is based in Birmingham at the Coffin Works. Its Executive Director and Joint Founder is Ian Harvey. The president of Civic Voice is Griff Rhys Jones. Civic Voice's Vice Presidents are Laura Sandys, Baroness Andrews, Sir Terry Farrell and Freddie Gick. The Chair of Civic Voice is Joan Humble.

Function 

Civic Voice works to make the places where everyone lives more attractive, enjoyable and distinctive. It speaks up for civic societies and local communities across England and promotes civic pride. It aims to build stronger, more active, and more engaged communities through its work and aspires to have a nation of active citizens.

Civic Voice is a membership organisation and its members are the civic societies around the country. The organisation has 332 members.

Civic Voice is the public entry point and provides the secretariat for the All Party Parliamentary Group for Civic Societies.

Campaigns 

Campaigns led by Civic Voice include:

 Putting community led design at the heart of placemaking
 Big Conservation Conversation
England's favourite Conservation Area.
 Civic Day
 High Streets
 Local Heritage List
 Rebalancing the planning system: Giving communities a meaningful voice
 Street clutter campaign.
 War memorials

See also 

 Civic Trust
 Civic Trust for Wales
 The Scottish Civic Trust

References

External Links 

 

Organizations established in 2010
Charities based in England
Heritage organisations in England
2010 establishments in England
Interested parties in planning in England
Architectural conservation
Architecture in England
Civic societies in the United Kingdom
Organisations based in Birmingham, West Midlands